Merchiston railway station was a railway station which served the area of Merchiston in Edinburgh, Scotland, for around eighty years. The station was built by the Caledonian Railway between 1879 and 1883, with the last passenger service in September 1965. The station was demolished shortly afterwards and the track bed has become a footpath.

The station was located in the neighbourhood sometimes known as "North Merchiston" but more commonly as Shandon, and typically taken to be part of the area of Polwarth, rather than Merchiston. Merchiston was also served by Craiglockhart railway station to the south-west of the area, on the North British Railway's Edinburgh Suburban and Southside Junction Railway.

Construction of the station
The station was constructed between 1879 and 1883 with two platforms and a small overhead footbridge. The station was located around 1 km east of Slateford Station and approximately 2.25 km west of Princes Street Station, at the bottom of  Place (since renamed Harrison Place).

Closure
The station closed on 6 September 1965 with services to/from Edinburgh Princes Street diverted to Edinburgh Waverley. After closure the first part of the old line from Princes Street Station became the West Approach Road, built in the 1970s .  The part of the track occupying the former station at Merchiston is now a footpath, extending to a service road leading west to Slateford Yards.

References

Sources

External links
 Information about Merchiston Station
 Edinburgh's railway history (via archive.org)

Disused railway stations in Edinburgh
Railway stations in Great Britain opened in 1882
Railway stations in Great Britain closed in 1965
Demolished buildings and structures in Scotland
Beeching closures in Scotland
Former Caledonian Railway stations
1882 establishments in Scotland
1965 disestablishments in Scotland